The 1934 Rhode Island gubernatorial election was held on November 6, 1934. Incumbent Democrat Theodore F. Green defeated Republican nominee Luke H. Callan with 56.62% of the vote.

General election

Candidates
Major party candidates
Theodore F. Green, Democratic 
Luke H. Callan, Republican

Other candidates
Joseph M. Coldwell, Socialist

Results

References

1934
Rhode Island
Gubernatorial